Myosin-4 also known as myosin, heavy chain 4 is a protein which in humans is encoded by the MYH4 gene.

Function 

MYH4 is a gene that encodes a sarcomeric myosin.

References

Further reading